The International Professional Wrestling Hall of Fame (IPWHF)  is an American professional wrestling hall of fame and museum that is located in Albany, New York. The museum was founded by Seth Turner, Tony Vellano, the founder of Professional Wrestling Hall of Fame and Museum, Michael Viscosi, Andrew Groff, Joe Defino, and Mike Lanuto on December 10, 2019. Seth Turner was named the President of the IPWHF and Tony Vellano was named Vice President of Talent and Community Relations. The launching of the IPWHF began after the New York State Board of Regents approved a provisional charter for the new hall. Its purpose is to "ensure the contributions to professional wrestling by individuals from various backgrounds and diverse cultures will be highlighted in the establishment". IPWHF declared itself a non profit organization.

Members
Class of 2021
 Bruno Sammartino
 Ric Flair
 Hulk Hogan
 André the Giant
 Terry Funk
 Giant Baba
 Ed 'Strangler' Lewis
 Mil Máscaras
 Lou Thesz
 Buddy Rogers
 Frank Gotch
 Danny Hodge
 Great Gama
 Yusuf İsmail
 Paul Pons
 Rikidōzan
 Martin 'Farmer' Burns
 George Hackenschmidt
 Evan 'Strangler' Lewis
 William Muldoon
 Satoru Sayama
 Antonio Inoki
 Stanislaus Zbyszko
 Tatsumi Fujinami
Class of 2022
Aleksander Aberg
Stone Cold Steve Austin
Fred Beell
Mildred Burke
Tom Cannon
Riki Choshu
Dory Funk Jr.
Karl Gotch
Tom Jenkins
Jim Londos
Billy Robinson
Joe Stecher
Genichiro Tenryu
Class of 2023
June Byers
Dan McLeod
Dr. B.F. Roller
Georg Lurich
Tom Connors
Verne Gagne
Gorgeous George
Mitsuharu Misawa
Bert Assirati
Bret Hart
Bob Backlund
The Great Muta
Kenta Kobashi

See also
List of professional wrestling conventions

References

External links
IPWHF official website

Awards established in 2019
Professional wrestling-related lists

Halls of fame in New York (state)